"See Saw Margery Daw" is an English language nursery rhyme, folk song and playground singing game. The rhyme first appeared in its modern form in Mother Goose's Melody, published in London in around 1765. It has a Roud Folk Song Index number of 13028.

Lyrics and melody
A common modern version is:

See Saw Margery Daw,
Jacky shall have a new master;
Jacky shall earn but a penny a day,
Because he can't work any faster.

The name Jacky is often replaced with Johnny or Jack.

The melody commonly associated with the rhyme was first recorded by the composer and nursery rhyme collector James William Elliott in his National Nursery Rhymes and Nursery Songs (1870).

Meaning and origin
The seesaw is one of the oldest 'rides' for children, easily constructed from logs of different sizes. The words of "See Saw Margery Daw" reflect children playing on a see-saw and singing this rhyme to accompany their game. No person has been identified by the name Margery Daw and so it is assumed that this was purely used to rhyme with the words 'seesaw'.

The rhyme may have its origins as a work song for sawyers, helping to keep rhythm when using a two-person saw. In his 1640 play The Antipodes, Richard Brome indicated the connection between sawyers and the phrase "see saw sacke a downe". The game of see-saw in which two children classically sit opposite each other holding hands and moving backwards and forwards first appears in print from about 1700.

The Opies note that "daw" means "a lazy person",
but in Scots it is "an untidy woman, a slut, a slattern" and give this
variant of "Margery Daw":

See-saw, Margery Daw,
Sold her bed and lay on the straw;
Sold her bed and lay upon hay
And pisky came and carried her away.
For wasn't she a dirty slut
To sell her bed and lie in the dirt?

References

External links

See Saw Margery Daw
Nonsense poetry, essay by George Orwell, including Margery Daw

Singing games
English children's songs
English folk songs
Traditional children's songs
English nursery rhymes